NewsChannel 3 refers to:
WREG-TV in Memphis, Tennessee
WSAZ in Huntington/Charleston, West Virginia
WWMT in Kalamazoo, Michigan